Jorrit Petrus Carolina Hendrix (born 6 February 1995) is a Dutch professional footballer who plays as a defensive midfielder for German  club Fortuna Düsseldorf.

Club career

PSV 
Hendrix started playing youth football at hometown club SV Panningen. From there, he joined the youth academy of PSV Eindhoven in 2004. Hendrix made his professional debut as a Jong PSV player in the second-tier Eerste Divisie on 3 August 2013 against Sparta Rotterdam. A week later, he made his Eredivisie debut against NEC in a 5–0 home win. He replaced Karim Rekik after 86 minutes. Ten days after his official debut, Hendrix signed a new contract with PSV, which tied him to the club until 2017. On 31 August 2013, he made his first start against Cambuur at home. Hendrix scored the first goal for the PSV first team on 26 October 2014. That day, he scored the 3–0 in the 25th minute of a league match against Utrecht. Hendrix won his first league title with PSV on 18 April 2015, after the club had kept a table lead since the second matchday of the season. A 4–1 victory at home against Heerenveen on matchday 31 ensured the title. As a result, Hendrix made his debut in the UEFA Champions League main tournament on 15 September 2015. That day, PSV beat Manchester United 2–1 at home, with Hendrix playing the entire game.

Hendrix scored the only goal of the game on 5 December 2015 during a 1–0 competition match against Vitesse. By doing this, he ensured that PSV scored at least one goal for the 42nd league game in a row, a new record in the Eredivisie. This record eventually rose to 54 league games. On 18 December 2015, Hendrix extended his contract with PSV until 2020. He won the league title with PSV for the second time in a row on 8 May 2016. The club started the last matchday of the season with the same number of points as rivals Ajax, but with a negative six goal difference. PSV beat PEC Zwolle 1–3 that day, while Ajax drew 1–1 at De Graafschap. Hendrix saw this happen from the stands, as he missed the last four games of the season due to an injury.

Hendrix started the 2016–17 season as a starter. Upon midfielder Stijn Schaars' departure, Hendrix was given the number 8 shirt. During a Champions League match against FC Rostov in late September, he left the pitch with a knee injury. This injury kept him sidelined until he made his comeback on 14 January 2017, in a league game won at home over Excelsior. He did not return as a starter that year, with fellow midfielders Andrés Guardado and Davy Pröpper almost always preferred, and Siem de Jong, newcomer Bart Ramselaar and especially Marco van Ginkel competing heavily for the spot in midfield. Hendrix returned as a starter for the 2017–18 season from the first matchday. In that role, he won the national title with PSV for the third time that year, with the team beating Ajax 3–0 on 15 April 2018 en route to clinch the championship. Hendrix signed a one-and-a-half-year contract extension with PSV on 14 January 2019 until mid-2021. That season, he faced competition for his position from Michal Sadílek, who already knew his new head coach Mark van Bommel from his time as the PSV U19 coach.

From his first 100 matches playing for PSV, they won 78. This places him in the top ten of players with the most Eredivisie victories in their first one hundred games. It is an illustrious list which includes Johan Cruijff, Johan Neeskens, Ruud Krol, Arie Haan, and Edwin van der Sar. Former Ajax player Horst Blankenburg leads the way with 83 victories in his first 100 games.

Spartak Moscow 
On 12 January 2021, with less than six months left on his contract with PSV, Hendrix moved to Russian club Spartak Moscow on a deal worth €500,000. On 16 January 2021, Spartak confirmed that he signed a long-term contract with the club. On 17 January 2021, he held his first training session with Spartak at the winter training camp in Dubai. He made his debut for the club on 20 February 2021 in the starting lineup of the away match of the Russian Cup against Dynamo Moscow, a 0–2 loss. On 28 February, he made his league debut in the 0–2 home loss to Rubin Kazan.

Loan to Feyenoord
On 26 January 2022, he joined Feyenoord on loan until the end of the 2021–22 season, with an option to buy.

Fortuna Düsseldorf
On 11 August 2022, Hendrix signed a one-season contract with Fortuna Düsseldorf in Germany.

International career
Hendrix was called up to the senior Netherlands squad to face Greece and Sweden in August 2016.

Career statistics

Club

Honours
PSV
Eredivisie: 2014–15, 2015–16, 2017-18
Johan Cruyff Shield: 2015, 2016
Maspalomas Cup: 2015

Feyenoord
 UEFA Europa Conference League runner-up: 2021–22

Netherlands
UEFA U-17 Championship: 2012

References

External links
 
 Voetbal International profile 

1995 births
Living people
Dutch footballers
Netherlands youth international footballers
Netherlands under-21 international footballers
Netherlands international footballers
Eredivisie players
Eerste Divisie players
Russian Premier League players
PSV Eindhoven players
Jong PSV players
FC Spartak Moscow players
Feyenoord players
Fortuna Düsseldorf players
People from Peel en Maas
Association football central defenders
Footballers from Limburg (Netherlands)
Dutch expatriate footballers
Dutch expatriate sportspeople in Russia
Expatriate footballers in Russia
Dutch expatriate sportspeople in Germany
Expatriate footballers in Germany